is a Japanese yuri manga written and illustrated by Ajiichi. It was serialized on Takeshobo's Manga Life Storia Dash website between 2018 and 2021, and collected into six bound volumes. The series was licensed for an English-language release by Seven Seas Entertainment in 2019.

Plot 
Fujishiro Nanaki concentrates on being pretty, and is annoyed by others like Kurokawa Kanade who she considers plain. However, after finding out that her boyfriend was cheating on her, Nanaki is consoled by Kanade and their relationship begins a new development.

Characters 
Kurokawa Kanade
 A quiet girl who is so non-confrontational that she often walks away from unkind comments said to her at school. 
Fujishiro Nanaki
 A popular girl who places more importances on looking cute then reaching class on time. Kanade soon becomes Nanaki's new makeover project after her boyfriend is revealed to have been cheating on her.

Publication 
Written and illustrated by Ajiichi, Failed Princesses was serialised on Takeshobo's Manga Life Storia Dash website from April 6th, 2018 to August 6th, 2021 and was collected into 6 tankōbon volumes. Seven Seas Entertainment licensed the series for release on print and digital platforms from May 12, 2020.

Reception 
Anime News Network gave volume one an overall rating of A−, noting that "Nanaki's use of the phrase “repay you with my body” (meaning her make up and shopping skills) is loaded, with Kanade giving it a sexual connotation in her mind, but right now that's less important than the validation the girls bring to each other: that they are worthwhile people no matter what anyone else says." Erica Friedman of Yuricon praised the work, noting that "This series has a pretty standard beginning, but it definitely picks up steam as it moves along. "

References

External links 
Manga Life Storia Dash's Failed Princesses official website
Seven Seas Entertainment's Failed Princesses official website
 

2018 manga
Seven Seas Entertainment titles
Takeshobo manga
Yuri (genre) anime and manga